The Turkish Orienteering Federation is the national orienteering association in Turkey. Founded in 2002, it is recognized as the orienteering association for Turkey by the International Orienteering Federation, of which it is a member.

References

External links
Official website of the Turkish Orienteering Federation

International Orienteering Federation members
Orienteering
Organizations based in Ankara
Organizations established in 2002
2002 establishments in Turkey